Ilya Krikunov (born February 27, 1984) is a Russian professional ice hockey player who is currently an unrestricted free agent. He most recently played for Kunlun Red Star in the Kontinental Hockey League (KHL). He was selected by Vancouver Canucks in the 7th round (223rd overall) of the 2002 NHL Entry Draft.

On May 22, 2014, Krikunov signed as a free agent to a one-year contract with expansion club, HC Sochi. Krikunov broke out offensively in his three seasons with Sochi, collecting 112 points in 169 games before returning to former club, Avtomobilist Yekaterinburg on a one-year deal on May 3, 2017.

Krikunov played two further seasons with Avtomobilist before leaving as a free agent following the 2018–19 season, signing a two-year contract for a second stint with HC Sochi on May 1, 2019.

Career statistics

Regular season and playoffs

International

References

External links

1984 births
Living people
Amur Khabarovsk players
Avtomobilist Yekaterinburg players
Atlant Moscow Oblast players
HC Kunlun Red Star players
Khimik Voskresensk (KHL) players
Kristall Elektrostal players
Russian ice hockey forwards
Salavat Yulaev Ufa players
Sputnik Nizhny Tagil players
HC Sochi players
Ice hockey people from Moscow
Torpedo Nizhny Novgorod players
Vancouver Canucks draft picks